Ilgar Gurbanov (born 25 April 1986 in Baku, Soviet Union) is an Azerbaijani football player who last played for Sumgayit FK in the Azerbaijan Premier League.

Career

Club
Gurbanov started his career with Fenerbahçe PAF in 2000. In 2006, he transferred to FK Khazar Lankaran in his native country. On 7 August 2007, he signed a 3-year contract with Sivasspor. His contract will expire on 30 May 2010. In 2010 Gurbanov will play for the Turkish second division club Mersin İdmanyurdu.

On 31 May 2017, Gabala FK announced the signing of Gurbanov on a two-year contract.

On 20 August 2019, Gurbanov signed a one-year contract with Sumgayit FK.

International
When he was playing for Fenerbahçe PAF, he started to play for Turkey national youth teams. His debut for Turkey U15 against Greece was on 17 June 2001. He played 7 times for Turkey U15, 2 times for Turkey U16 and 4 times for Turkey U17 team.

He called for Azerbaijan and chose to play for them. On 28 April 2004 he debuted with Azerbaijan senior team against Kazakhstan. Gurbanov also holds a Turkish passport.

Career statistics

Club

International

Statistics accurate as of match played 4 June 2008

International goals
Scores and results list Azerbaijan's goal tally first.

Honours
Khazar Lankaran
Azerbaijan Premier League: (1) 2006-07

Qarabağ
Azerbaijan Premier League (4): 2013–14, 2014–15, 2015–16, 2016–17
Azerbaijan Cup: (2) 2014-15, 2015-16

Gabala
 Azerbaijan Cup: (1) 2018–19

References

External links
 
 Profile on official club website
Video about career of Ilgar Gurbanov

1986 births
Living people
Footballers from Baku
Azerbaijani footballers
Azerbaijan international footballers
Azerbaijani expatriate footballers
Turkish footballers
Turkey youth international footballers
Azerbaijani emigrants to Turkey
Fenerbahçe S.K. footballers
Khazar Lankaran FK players
Sivasspor footballers
Boluspor footballers
AZAL PFK players
Mersin İdman Yurdu footballers
Qarabağ FK players
Azerbaijan Premier League players
TFF First League players
Süper Lig players
Association football midfielders